The Radio-Television of the Federation of Bosnia and Herzegovina (locally known as Radiotelevizija Federacije Bosne i Hercegovine or RTVFBiH for short) is entity level public broadcaster which operates own radio and television services in the Federation of Bosnia and Herzegovina entity.

Services
The radio and television program is mainly produced in Bosnian and Croatian language. Headquarters of RTVFBiH is located in Sarajevo (along with national public broadcaster – BHRT and local public broadcaster TVSA). Television program initially aired on two television channels (FTV1 and FTV2). Since April 2003 the television program is reduced to one (under the label FTV).

RTVFBiH currently consists of two organizational units:
 Federalni Radio – entity level public radio service and 
 Federalna televizija – entity level public television channel

There is a public corporation in the establishment which should be consisted of all public broadcasters in Bosnia and Herzegovina.

See also 
 Federalni Radio 
 Federalna televizija
 RTRS
 BHRT

References

External links 
 

 
Multilingual broadcasters
Television channels and stations established in 2001
Television stations in Bosnia and Herzegovina
Radio stations established in 2001
Mass media in Sarajevo
Publicly funded broadcasters
2001 establishments in Bosnia and Herzegovina
Government-owned companies of Bosnia and Herzegovina